South Side is a village in County Durham, in England. It is situated to the north of Butterknowle, a few miles west of Bishop Auckland.

References

External links
 Durham County Council official website

Villages in County Durham